Frank Riseley and Sydney Smith defeated George Caridia and Arthur Gore 6–3, 6–4, 6–3 in the All Comers' Final, but the reigning champions Laurence Doherty and Reginald Doherty defeated Riseley and Smith 6–1, 6–2, 6–4 in the challenge round to win the gentlemen's doubles tennis title at the 1904 Wimbledon Championships.

Draw

Challenge round

All comers' finals

Top half

The nationality of AL Irvine is unknown.

Bottom half

References

External links

Men's Doubles
Wimbledon Championship by year – Men's doubles